Lucifer is an American fantasy police procedural comedy-drama television series developed by Tom Kapinos that premiered on Fox on January 25, 2016. It features a character created by Neil Gaiman, Sam Kieth, and Mike Dringenberg taken from the comic book series The Sandman, which later became the protagonist of the spin-off comic book series Lucifer written by Mike Carey, both published by DC Comics' Vertigo imprint. In May 2018, Fox canceled the series after three seasons, and it was announced in June 2018 that Netflix had picked the series up.

Series overview

Episodes

Season 1 (2016)

Season 2 (2016–17)

Season 3 (2017–18)

Season 4 (2019)

Season 5 (2020–21)

Season 6 (2021)

Ratings

Season 1

Season 2

Season 3

Notes

References

Lucifer (TV series)
Lists of American comedy-drama television series episodes
Lists of American crime drama television series episodes
Lists of American fantasy television series episodes
Lucifer